is a compilation album by Japanese singer Keiko Masuda. Released through Victor on July 27, 2022 to coincide with the 40th anniversary of Masuda's solo career, the album compiles her solo works from 1981 to 2022, plus two songs she recorded during her days as a member of Pink Lady and a selection of live recordings. A limited edition release includes a DVD covering her 40th anniversary concert and a photo book.

The album peaked at No. 118 on Oricon's albums chart.

Track listing

Charts

References

External links
 

2022 compilation albums
Keiko Masuda albums
Japanese-language compilation albums
Victor Entertainment compilation albums